The coat of arms of Rhode Island is an official emblem of the state, alongside the seal and state flag. The blazon (description) was officially adopted by the General Assembly in 1881, to be effective 1 February 1882.

The arms are described legally thus: "The arms of the state are a golden anchor on a blue field, and the motto thereof is the word 'Hope'".

Use
Besides being used by itself, the coat of arms of Rhode Island is used on the standard (flag) of the Governor of Rhode Island, and many governmental seals of the state.

See also
Coats of arms of the U.S. states

References

External links 

Symbols of Rhode Island
Rhode Island
Rhode Island